Cherhill is a village and civil parish in Wiltshire, England. The parish includes the village of Yatesbury.

Overview 
Cherhill has a population of around 700 with a mixture of housing ranging from thatched cottages (some dating to the 14th century) to newly built detached houses. The River's Brook rises in the northeast of the village and flows west towards Quemerford, where it joins the River Marden.

Cherhill is known for the Cherhill White Horse cut into the chalk hillside in 1780, the Landsdowne obelisk on the Cherhill Downs, and the crop circles that appeared in the fields at the bottom of the Downs. The area around the horse and obelisk is owned by the National Trust. On a clear day, the  summit offers fine views, up to 25 miles, with the water tower at Tetbury in Gloucestershire visible. Atop the tall hill to the north of the village, opposite to Cherhill Downs, it is said to be possible to see the Severn crossings to South Wales,  to the west.

Location
Cherhill lies on an old coaching road, now called the A4, which runs from central London to Bristol. The village is served by the Wigglybus scheme, which runs from Cherhill and other surrounding villages into nearby Calne and connects to further transport links.

History
John Marius Wilson's Imperial Gazetteer of England and Wales (1870–1872) says of Cherhill: 

The Lansdowne Monument, or Cherhill Monument, is a 125-foot stone obelisk erected in 1845 by the Third Marquis of Lansdowne on Cherhill Down in honour of his ancestor Sir William Petty.

The civil parish increased in size in 1934, when Cherhill gained some land from Calne Without and absorbed the whole of Yatesbury parish.

Cherhill Downs, White Horse and Oldbury hillfort
Near the top of Cherhill Down stands Oldbury Camp or Oldbury Castle (not to be confused with sites having similar names in Somerset and Kent), which began as a Bronze Age enclosure and was enlarged in the Iron Age to become a hillfort.

The Cherhill White Horse was cut out of the hillside in 1780. It has been restored several times due to chalk being washed away and weeds growing on it. The horse is visible from miles around and has become a landmark synonymous with the village and local area.

From here it is possible to see the route of a Roman road heading toward the nearby Wansdyke trade route. The top of the hill is popular with ramblers, dog walkers and power kiters, owing to the powerful winds in action.

The Cherhill Gang 
The Cherhill Gang was a notorious group of highway men who operated in the 18th century on the London to Bath main road (A4) which passes through the village – they were noted for their robbery technique of attacking the carriages of rich Londoners while completely naked, thus shocking passengers into handing over their money and also making it harder to identify them. A painting depicting one such attack can be seen in the Black Horse pub, on the A4 main road in the village.

Sundial 
At one of the village's bus shelters is a millennium project of a sundial. Consisting of a vertical sarsen stone inside a face of Roman numerals, it symbolises the passage of time.

Parish church 

The Church of England parish church of St James has 12th-century origins. Most of the building, including the tower, is from the 15th century. A west gallery in Gothic style was added in 1840, and restoration in 1863 was by S.B. Gabriel. The church was designated as Grade II* listed in 1960.

Cherhill was a dependent church of St Mary's, Calne until 1842. The ecclesiastical parish was enlarged in 1879 when 204 acres were transferred from Calne. Since 1973 the parish has been part of the Oldbury Benefice.

Governance 
The Parish Council has a mostly consultative role, while the Wiltshire Council unitary authority is responsible for all significant local government functions. The parish forms part of the North Wiltshire parliamentary constituency.

Amenities 
Cherhill has a primary school, built at Middle Lane in 1961 to replace a small school on The Street which was built in 1846 or 1847.

The village hall was built in 1977, next to the old school. In 2015 a new building was proposed, on a larger site immediately east of the village boundary.

Cherhill Cricket Club play in the Wiltshire League. The village has a pub, the Black Horse.

Bibliography 
 Plenderleath, Rev. W. C., On the White Horses of Wiltshire and Its Neighbourhood (Wilts Archaeological Magazine, vol. 14 for the year 1872, pp. 12–30)
Plenderleath, Rev. W. C., White Horses of the West of England (London, Allen & Storr, 1892)
Plenderleath, Rev. W. C., Plenderleath's Memoranda of Cherhill (2001)

References

External links

 
 Cherhill village website
 

Villages in Wiltshire
Civil parishes in Wiltshire